Alfonso Petrucci (c. 1491 – July 16, 1517) was an Italian nobleman, born to the Petrucci Family. He was the son of Pandolfo Petrucci. In 1511, he was made a cardinal, which gave the Petrucci dynasty some influence within the church.

He was sentenced to death for plotting to kill Pope Leo X. On July 16, 1517, Alfonso was privately strangled to death in his cell in Rome.

References

External links

 
  

16th-century Italian cardinals
1490s births
1517 deaths
People from Siena
Alfonso
House of Medici
16th-century executions by Italian states
Executed Italian people
People executed by the Papal States
People executed by strangulation
16th-century Italian nobility